TSU Tbilisi is a Georgian association football club. The club played in Umaglesi Liga from 1996 until 2001, and withdrew from Pirveli Liga in 2004.

The club represent Tbilisi State University.

External links

Football clubs in Georgia (country)
Football clubs in Tbilisi